The 29th annual Señorita México pageant, was held 1983. Thirty-two contestants competed for the national title, which was won by Mónica Rosas from Durango who competed in Miss Universe 1983. Rosas was crowned by outgoing Señorita México titleholder Carmen López.

The Señorita Mundo México title was won by Mayra Rojas from Oaxaca who competed in Miss World 1983. Rojas was crowned by outgoing Señorita México titleholder Alba Cervera.

Rosalba Chávez from Puebla was chosen to compete in Miss International 1983.

Results

Special Awards

Judges
Jame Vertelot
Leopoldo Méraz
Osmel Sousa
Ricardo Ponzanelli
Shanik Berman
Carlos Rodríguez
Mario Ernesto
Emmanuel
Martha Sussana Gómez
Paulino Rivera
Nohemí Atamoros
Julio Alemán
Jaime Rentería
Jaime Radilla
Servando González
Sergio Bernard
Manuel Pallarez
Dulce María Ruíz
Jaime Quiroz
Enrique Castillo Pesado
Alfonso Neimar
Ernesto Lookin
Tonny Chefler
Rubén Orozco
Julio Chávez
Luisa María Manjárrez

Expected Contestants

Señorita México

Beauty pageants in Mexico
1983 beauty pageants
1983 in Mexico